The Embassy of Colombia in Brasília is the diplomatic mission of the Republic of Colombia to the Federative Republic of Brazil; it is headed by the Ambassador of Colombia to Brazil. It is located in the Southern Embassy Sector (SES) in the Asa Sul district of Brasília, precisely on lot 10 of block 803.

The Embassy is also accredited to the Republic of Angola, the Republic of Benin, the Republic of Cameroon, the Republic of the Congo, the Gabonese Republic, the Republic of Ghana, and the Republic of Liberia. The Embassy is charged with representing the interests of the President and Government of Colombia, improving diplomatic relations between Colombia and the accredited countries, promoting and improving the image and standing of Colombia in the accredited nations, promoting the Culture of Colombia, encouraging and facilitating tourism to and from Colombia, and ensuring the safety of Colombians abroad.

The Embassy, along with the Official Residence of the Ambassador located in the same complex, were built in 1979 and designed by Brazilian architect César Barney Caldas, and inaugurated in 1981 by President of Colombia, Julio Turbay Ayala, the President of Brazil, João Batista Figueiredo, and Ambassador of Colombia to Brazil, Germán Rodríguez Fonnegra. The buildings are essentially functional and sober with straight horizontal lines, and naked concrete.

References

External links
 

Brasilia
Colombia
Brazil–Colombia relations
Government buildings completed in 1979